Candy Moore  (born August 26, 1947) is an American actress from Maplewood, New Jersey. Moore attended UCLA School of Theatre Arts.  Moore began her career appearing on television series such as Leave It to Beaver and Letter to Loretta. In 1962, she was cast as Lucille Ball's daughter Chris Carmichael on The Lucy Show. Moore remained a regular on The Lucy Show through the end of the 1964–1965 season after which the premise of the show was retooled and most of the supporting cast was written out. Moore also appeared nine times on  The Donna Reed Show, five of which as Angie Quinn, the girlfriend of series character Jeff Stone (Paul Petersen).

Career
In 1959–1960, she appeared in two episodes of the second season of One Step Beyond, as Carolyn Peters in "Forked Lightning" (ep. 9), and as Callie Wylie in "Goodbye Grandpa" (ep. 38).

In 1961, she played Margie Manners, the kitchen seductress of Wally Cleaver, in the Leave It To Beaver episode "Mother's Helper" (S4:E23). That same year she also acted in one episode each of The Loretta Young Show and Wagon Train.

In 1961–1962, she portrayed Gillian Favor in two episodes of Rawhide. She also appeared in the first season of My Three Sons as a hiker in the 1961 episode "Fire Watch" (ep. 36).

Moore also starred in a television pilot titled Time Out for Ginger, which aired on CBS on September 18, 1962. However, it didn't sell.

Moore has also appeared in films such as Raging Bull, The Night of the Grizzly, Tomboy and the Champ, and Lunch Wagon.

Candy Moore, the model and actress who appeared in the 1981 television series Lunch Wagon, is often confused with an actress of the same name who starred in The Lucy Show and married actor Paul Gleason. The case of incorrect identity is pervasive throughout the Internet, having the Lucy Show actress often linked to, and credited with, the work of the model found on the Cars' album. The Candy Moore from the cover of the Candy-O album can also be found wearing a red shirt on the cover of Rick James' album Street Songs, and on subsequent sleeves for his singles such as "Ghetto Life". Other shots of the model during the Candy-O cover shoot, can be found in a video interview with David Robinson.

Up to 2019, she taught English at the East Los Angeles Performing Arts Academy Magnet at Esteban E. Torres High School.

Filmography

Film

Television

References

External links
 
 
 Candy Moore posing with album cover

1947 births
Living people
People from Maplewood, New Jersey
20th-century American actresses
American film actresses
American television actresses
Actresses from New Jersey
21st-century American women